Dobrije is a small settlement on the right and left banks of the Meža River in the Municipality of Ravne na Koroškem in the Carinthia region in northern Slovenia.

There is a small chapel in the settlement. It was built in 1917 and has an elliptical floor plan with a belfry.

References

External links
Dobrije on Geopedia

Populated places in the Municipality of Ravne na Koroškem